Club Esportiu Júpiter is a Spanish football team based in Barcelona in the district of Sant Martí, in the autonomous community of Catalonia. Founded in 1909, it plays in the Tercera División – Group 5, holding home games at Camp Municipal La Verneda, with a capacity of 6,000 seats.Roman DC

Season to season

2 seasons in Segunda División
1 season in Segunda División B
46 seasons in Tercera División

Current squad

Famous players
 Crisant Bosch
 José Parra
 Joaquim Rifé

References

External links
Official website 

Football clubs in Catalonia
Football clubs in Barcelona
Association football clubs established in 1909
1909 establishments in Spain
Segunda División clubs